Jena Forest is an urban forest located, in Jena, Thuringia, Germany. It is managed by Kommunalservice Jena (Jena Municipal Service). The forest is 2500 hectares in extent.

References

Jena
Forests and woodlands of Thuringia